Nocardioides fonticola is a Gram-positive and rod-shaped bacterium from the genus Nocardioides which has been isolated from a freshwater spring in Kaohsiung, Taiwan.

References

External links
Type strain of Nocardioides fonticola at BacDive -  the Bacterial Diversity Metadatabase

Further reading 
 

fonticola
Bacteria described in 2008